The 2021 Boca Raton Bowl was a college football bowl game played on December 18, 2021, with kickoff at 11:00 a.m. EST on ESPN. It was the 8th edition of the Boca Raton Bowl, and was one of the 2021–22 bowl games concluding the 2021 FBS football season. Sponsored by roofing repair company RoofClaim.com, the game was officially known as the RoofClaim.com Boca Raton Bowl.

Teams
Consistent with conference tie-ins, the game was played between teams from the Sun Belt Conference and Conference USA (C-USA). The bowl also has tie-ins with the American Athletic Conference (AAC), Mid-American Conference (MAC), and Mountain West Conference (MWC).

This was the sixth meeting between Western Kentucky and Appalachian State; the Mountaineers entered leading the all-time series, 4–1.  It was also the first time the Mountaineers and Hilltoppers played each other as FBS teams.

Western Kentucky quarterback Bailey Zappe entered the game on the verge of FBS records for single-season passing yardage and touchdowns, respectively set by B. J. Symons of Texas Tech in 2003 and Joe Burrow of LSU in 2019.

Western Kentucky Hilltoppers

Appalachian State Mountaineers

Game summary
During the game, Zappe threw for 6 touchdowns and 422 yards, giving him possession of both aforementioned single-season FBS passing records. He finished the season with 62 touchdowns and 5,977 yards. Zappe also tied Burrow's single-season FBS record of 65 touchdowns responsible for (combined passing and rushing) from 2019.

Statistics

References

External links
 Game statistics at statbroadcast.com

Boca Raton Bowl
Boca Raton Bowl
Boca Raton Bowl
Appalachian State Mountaineers football bowl games
Western Kentucky Hilltoppers football bowl games
Boca Raton Bowl